The Muslim League National Guard, also called Muslim National Guard, was a quasi-military organization, associated All-India Muslim League that took part in the Pakistan Movement. It actively took part in the violence that ensued during the Partition of India.

In East Bengal, the Muslim National Guard was popularly known as the Azrail Bahini.

The organization was banned in 1948 by the Indian government.

History

Foundation

The Muslim National Guard was founded in the United Provinces in 1931. The stated goal of the organization was to organize the Muslim youths in order to cultivate among them a spirit of tolerance, sacrifice and discipline.

Revival
The Muslim National Guard was revived at a meeting of the Committee of Action of the Muslim League held at Lahore in 1944. The goals were to strengthen the social and physical development of Muslims and to create a spirit of self-sacrifice and service. A uniform for the guards was created, turning it into a quasi-military organisation. The organization was revamped in all the provinces of British India.

By the end of 1946, the MLNG had 22,000 members. But lagged behind its Hindu counterpart, the Rashtriya Swayamsevak Sangh, which had twice as many. In Punjab, it had to also reckon with the Sikh force, Akal Fauj.

Presence throughout the Regions

Punjab

Bengal and Bihar 
In Bengal, Huseyn Shaheed Suhrawardy, at the inauguration of a training center in Faridpur, stated that those who were getting training at the center would act as the soldiers for the achievement of Pakistan and would save the Muslims from enemy attacks. In 1946, Abdul Monem Khan organized the Muslim National Guard in Mymensingh with 100,000 volunteers and became the Salar-i-Zilla or the commander-in-chief of the district.

The members of the National Guard wore distinctive green uniforms with green hats and carried green flags.

Role in Partition violence

On 24 January 1946, the Coalition Government declared both the Muslim National Guard and the Rashtriya Swayamsevak Sangh illegal organizations. The private armies were considered a menace to the State and hence won't be tolerated. Ghazarfar Ali opposed the Government decision contending that a ban on the Muslim National Guard was a ban on the most important activities of the Muslim League. On 14 August 1946, two days before the Direct Action Day started in Kolkata, the members of the Muslim National Guards were called upon to assemble at the Muslim Institute at 8:30a.m. During the violence in the Punjab, the Muslim National Guards worked closely with the Khaksars and the Ahrars.

Ban

The organization was banned after the Indian government launched a crackdown against organizations dedicated to promoting communal hatred or preaching violence in the aftermath of the assassination of Mahatma Gandhi.

Criticism 
Evan Meredith Jenkins, the last British Governor of the Punjab compared the Muslim National Guard to Nazi storm troopers. Historian Rakesh Batabyal draws parallels between fascist methods and the creation of paramilitary forces such as the Muslim National Guard. He observes that Juan José Linz's analysis of fascist organizations applies: elected political parties using violence against opponents instead of political campaigning was a tragic innovation.

See also
 National Guard (Pakistan), a military reserve created in 1948

References

Bibliography 
 
 

Muslim League
Military wings of nationalist parties
Military units and formations established in 1931
Paramilitary organisations based in India
Pakistan Movement
Organisations designated as terrorist by India
1931 establishments in British India
1948 disestablishments in India
Partition of India